Qeshlaq-e Anuch (also Romanized as Qeshlāq-e Anūch; also known as Armanābād, Qeshlāq-e Anūj, and Qeshlāq-e Anūjs) is a village in Sefidkuh Rural District, Samen District, Malayer County, Hamadan Province, Iran. At the 2006 census, its population was 277, in 77 families.

References 

Populated places in Malayer County